The Grupos Armados Españoles (GAE) (English: Spanish Armed Groups) was a Spanish neo-fascist paramilitary organisation active from 1979 to 1980, primarily in the Basque Country. A report by the Office for Victims of Terrorism of the Basque Government in June 2010 attributed six murders to the group, and linked it to the National Police Corps, SECED and the Civil Guard.

Attacks
Attacks attributed to the Spanish Armed Groups:

28 September 1979: Assassination of Tomás Alba Irazusta, Herri Batasuna town councillor of Donostia in Astigarraga.
15 January 1980: Assassination of Carlos Saldise Corta (member of the Gestoras Pro Amnistía) in Lezo.
20 January 1980: Alonsotegi bombing. four killed and 10 injured.

Alleged links with Francoist repression
The report of the Office of Victims of Terrorism of the Basque Government said that the GAE was a well organized group that "acted with a high level of tolerance, when no complicity with important sectors of the police apparatus of the time", and criticized the impunity and lack of investigation about group actions.

Notes

References

Far-right politics in Spain
Paramilitary organisations based in Spain
1979 establishments in Spain
Organizations established in 1979
1980 disestablishments in Spain
Organizations disestablished in 1980
Far-right terrorism in Spain
Anti-communist terrorism
20th century in Spain
Basque history
Political history of Spain
Spanish nationalism